The persecution of the Alloa witches began in Stirling on 19 May 1658, in Commonwealth times. On this date, the presbyter Matthias Symson met with George Bennett, minister of Saint Ninian's, to confer with the persons there apprehended for witchcraft and to try to bring them to confession. On 23 June 1658, the Presbytery held a subsequent meeting to the suspected persons. The first person to go to trial was Margaret Duchill. There were a total of 12 women accused of witchcraft from the urban parish, which may include Alloa's adjacent rural area. 

One important aspect of the Scottish witchcraft trials was the reports of demonic sex. Women were asked about sex with the devil regularly, this was more of an interest of the authorities in deviant sex rather than in the witches' real lives.

References 

17th century in Scotland
People accused of witchcraft
People executed for witchcraft
Witch trials in Scotland
17th-century trials